Maria (minor planet designation: 170 Maria) is a Main belt asteroid that was discovered by French astronomer Henri Joseph Perrotin on January 10, 1877. Its orbit was computed by Antonio Abetti, and the asteroid was named after his sister, Maria. This is the namesake of the Maria asteroid family; one of the first asteroid families to be identified by Japanese astronomer Kiyotsugu Hirayama in 1918.

In the Tholen classification system, this is categorized as a stony S-type asteroid. Observations performed at the Palmer Divide Observatory in Colorado Springs, Colorado during 2007 produced a light curve with a period of 13.120 ± 0.002 hours and a brightness range of 0.21 ± 0.02 in magnitude. Previous measurements from 2000 gave 13.14 and 5.510 hour estimates for the period. Based upon its spectrum, it is classified as an S-type asteroid.

An occultation of a star by Maria was observed from Manitoba, Canada, on June 10, 1997.

References

External links 
 Lightcurve plot of 170 Maria, Palmer Divide Observatory, B. D. Warner (2007)
 Asteroid Lightcurve Database (LCDB), query form (info )
 Dictionary of Minor Planet Names, Google books
 Asteroids and comets rotation curves, CdR – Observatoire de Genève, Raoul Behrend
 Discovery Circumstances: Numbered Minor Planets (1)-(5000) – Minor Planet Center
 
 

Maria asteroids
Maria
Maria
S-type asteroids (Tholen)
S-type asteroids (SMASS)
18770110
Objects observed by stellar occultation